The Battle of Hijla (21 March 1918) was fought by the forces of the British and Ottoman Empires during the Sinai and Palestine Campaign of the First World War. Hijla (now called Makhadet Hijla', lit. 'Partridge Ford'; cf. nearby Deir Hajla) is on the River Jordan a few miles upriver from the Dead Sea. Today the river is the boundary between Jordan and the "West Bank" area presently administered by Israel and the Palestinian Authority, but in 1918 it was territory of the Ottoman Empire. The British invasion had succeeded in taking Jerusalem at the end of 1917. British General Edmund Allenby attempted a "raid" across the Jordan toward Amman in an effort to sever the railroad and resistance was met at Hijla and to the north at Ghoraniyeh, where fords provided means to cross.

The river crossing was resisted by the Ottomans at both sites. The 2/19th Battalion (St. Pancras) London Regiment of the 60th Division tried to cross at Hijla, sending swimmers repeatedly across with ropes to attempt the construction of a pontoon bridge. Major Vivian Gilbert reported the events later. Many of the British soldiers were shot in the Jordan before the bridgehead could be established. Once established, the bridgeheads were maintained against the Ottomans, but the raids on Amman basically failed. This was the prelude to the Battle of Megiddo farther north in what is now Israel.

Notes

References
 Eames, F.W. (1930/2005). Second Nineteenth, being the History of the 2/19th London Regiment During the Great War. London: Waterlow, 1930, reprinted by Uckfield: Naval & Military, 2005, .
 Gilbert, Vivian  (1923). The Romance of the Last Crusade: With Allenby to Jerusalem, New York: D. Appleton.
 Woodward, David (2006). Hell in the Holy Land: World War 1 in the Middle East, University Press of Kentucky.

Battles of World War I involving the Ottoman Empire
Battles of World War I involving the United Kingdom
Battles of the Sinai and Palestine Campaign
1918 in the Ottoman Empire
March 1918 events